Allen is an unincorporated community and census-designated place in Wicomico County, Maryland, United States. Its population was 210 as of the 2010 census. It is part of the Salisbury, Maryland-Delaware Metropolitan Statistical Area.

The Asbury Methodist Episcopal Church, Bennett's Adventure, and Bounds Lott are listed on the National Register of Historic Places.

Demographics

References

 
Census-designated places in Maryland
Census-designated places in Wicomico County, Maryland
Salisbury metropolitan area